Landonis Balthazar "Lando" Calrissian III is a fictional character in the Star Wars franchise. He was introduced in The Empire Strikes Back (1980) as an old friend of Han Solo and the administrator of the floating Cloud City on the gas planet Bespin. Prior to the events of the film, Lando made a career as a gambler, con artist, playboy, mining engineer, and businessman, and was the owner of the Millennium Falcon until losing the ship to Han in a bet. In the film, when Cloud City is threatened by the Galactic Empire, Lando reluctantly betrays Han to Darth Vader, but later redeems himself by helping Han's friends escape from the Empire. In Return of the Jedi (1983), after becoming a general in the Rebel Alliance, Lando helps rescue Han from Jabba the Hutt and leads the attack on the second Death Star.

Lando is portrayed by Billy Dee Williams in the original trilogy, as well as the sequel film The Rise of Skywalker (2019), marking one of the longest intervals between portrayals of a character by the same actor in American film history. Donald Glover portrayed a younger version of the character in the standalone film Solo: A Star Wars Story (2018), which depicts the beginnings of his friendship with Han. Lando also appears frequently in the Star Wars Expanded Universe of novels, comic books and video games, including a series of novels focused on him.

The character has become one of the franchise's most popular, with Billy Dee Williams' performance receiving praise. Donald Glover's performance in Solo was also well received, being hailed as one of the film's highlights. Williams was nominated for the Saturn Award for Best Supporting Actor twice for his performances in The Empire Strikes Back and Return of the Jedi.

Appearances

Film
Lando is portrayed by Billy Dee Williams in The Empire Strikes Back (1980), Return of the Jedi (1983), and The Rise of Skywalker (2019), and by Donald Glover in Solo: A Star Wars Story (2018).

Original trilogy
Lando Calrissian first appears in The Empire Strikes Back as the administrator of Cloud City, an old friend of Han Solo (Harrison Ford), and the previous owner of Han's ship, the Millennium Falcon. When Han, Princess Leia (Carrie Fisher), Chewbacca (Peter Mayhew), and C-3PO (Anthony Daniels) arrive at Cloud City, Lando welcomes them as guests of honor - only to betray them to Darth Vader (portrayed by David Prowse, voiced by James Earl Jones), who plans to use them as bait to ensnare Luke Skywalker (Mark Hamill). Lando had reluctantly agreed to betray Han and company after Vader threatened to put Cloud City under the Galactic Empire's control if he refused. Lando allows Vader to freeze Han in carbonite and give him to bounty hunter Boba Fett (Jeremy Bulloch); when Vader takes Leia and Chewbacca prisoner, however, Lando's conscience gets the better of him, and in the ensuing evacuation of Cloud City he helps them escape in the Falcon. He later assists in rescuing Luke from the underside of Cloud City. Afterwards, he promises to help find Han.

In Return of the Jedi, Lando goes undercover to help Luke rescue Han from crime lord Jabba the Hutt. During a battle with Jabba's thugs, Han saves Lando from being devoured by the sarlacc; Lando then helps Han and the others destroy Jabba's barge. For his heroics, he is made a general in the Rebel Alliance. Lando then takes the pilot chair in his old ship, the Millennium Falcon, and leads the attack on the second Death Star. He leads the Rebel strike on the battle station, and personally destroys its power core, causing the station to explode. He then joins the other Rebels on Endor in celebrating their victory and the end of the Empire.

Sequel trilogy
Lando did not appear in the first film of the sequel trilogy, The Force Awakens (2015). According to Williams, the reason Lando did not return may have been that he did not fit into the storyline. His absence from the casting announcement caused the displeasure of some fans.

Lando was also absent from The Last Jedi (2017). During the early development of the film, director Rian Johnson briefly considered bringing back Lando as the codebreaker that Resistance members Finn (John Boyega) and Rose Tico (Kelly Marie Tran) seek in the coastal city of Canto Bight, but Lando was finally written out of the film's script, with the codebreaker role ultimately going to Benicio del Toro's character DJ.

Lando finally reappeared in 2019's The Rise of Skywalker, marking one of the longest intervals between portrayals of a character by the same actor in American film history. In the backstory to the film, in the years of peace after the Galactic Civil War, Lando attempted to start a family, and had a daughter, who was kidnapped by unknown culprits when she was two years old. In time, it became clear that the First Order was behind both her abduction and those of other children of former Rebel leaders. After the tragedy of losing his daughter and his failure in a quest with Luke Skywalker to find answers about the growing darkness in the Force, Lando settled on the desert planet of Pasaana and adopted a life of solitude.

Lando first appears in The Rise of Skywalker on Pasaana, guiding Rey (Daisy Ridley), Poe Dameron (Oscar Isaac), Finn, and Chewbacca toward a clue for the whereabouts of the Sith wayfinder. Poe asks Lando to aid the Resistance, but Lando refuses, saying he does not fly anymore, but sends his regards to Leia. Lando reappears much later in the film, upon Leia's death, and he tells a grieving Poe that he, Luke, Leia, and Han were similarly unprepared when they were fighting the Empire, but that they were able to succeed because they had each other. This inspires Poe to launch an offensive against the Sith Eternal forces, including the Final Order, with Lando traveling the galaxy to recruit Rebel veterans and other supporters of the Resistance's cause to help in the final battle. Just as the Resistance appears most overwhelmed in the battle, Lando, Chewbacca, and Wedge Antilles (Denis Lawson) arrive in the Millennium Falcon alongside a massive fleet of Resistance sympathizers, allies, and veterans, and they help to win the battle and the war. At the end of the film, as the galaxy is celebrating the Resistance's victory against Emperor Palpatine (Ian McDiarmid) and the Sith Eternal, Jannah (Naomi Ackie), a former stormtrooper, approaches Lando and says she does not know where she is from; he tells her that they will find out together.

Anthology films
Donald Glover portrays a young Lando Calrissian in Solo: A Star Wars Story, which takes place roughly thirteen years before The Empire Strikes Back. Glover had the opportunity to speak with Billy Dee Williams and seek his input. "He said, 'Just be charming'. Which is the best advice." Williams had expressed interest in making a cameo appearance (though likely as another character) in the film, but he did not ultimately appear.

In the film, Lando is introduced as a gambler and "retired" smuggler who owns a ship fast enough for Han (Alden Ehrenreich) and his associates to use in stealing a load of raw starship fuel. Han tries to win the ship (the Millennium Falcon) from him in a game of sabacc, but Lando cheats and cleans Han out. However, Lando agrees to join the team in exchange for a percentage of the profits from the mission. During the heist and subsequent escape, Lando is injured and his droid co-pilot L3-37 is irreparably damaged, but Han brings the Falcon to safety with help from L3's navigational database after he hotwires it into the ship's computer. Lando later takes the Falcon and abandons the team, but Han tracks him down and wins it from him in another game of sabacc, having stolen the card Lando had up his sleeve to let him cheat.

Kathleen Kennedy said, in a statement, that a film focusing on Lando Calrissian could happen, but it would not be a priority at the time.

Television series

Animated
Billy Dee Williams returned to the role in the Star Wars Rebels episodes "Idiot's Array" and "The Siege of Lothal".

In "Idiot's Array", Lando wins Chopper (voiced by Dave Filoni), the repair droid of the crew of the Ghost, in a game of sabacc, forcing the crew to assist him with a dangerous smuggling run to get their droid back. The crew become Lando's reluctant business partners following the ordeal, leading to their first encounter with the crime boss Azmorigan (voiced by James Hong). In "The Siege of Lothal", the crew of the Ghost approach Lando for help in getting off of Lothal, which is under Imperial occupation. He is also mentioned on occasion in various other episodes, becoming one of a couple of aliases employed by series protagonist Ezra Bridger (voiced by Taylor Gray).

Live-action
Lucasfilm is developing Lando, a series centering on the character for Disney+, with a story by Justin Simien. While his involvement hasn't been officially confirmed, Lucasfilm has had discussions with Donald Glover about reprising his role from Solo.

Video games
Billy Dee Williams reprises his role as Lando Calrissian in various games, including as a playable character in Star Wars Battlefront and Battlefront II. Only the second game narrates a continuous story.

Comics
Lando Calrissian is the lead character in Marvel Comics' Lando (2015), a five-issue miniseries set shortly before the original Star Wars trilogy. Lando has a brief appearance in Marvel's comic miniseries Shattered Empire (2015), set after Return of the Jedi. Lando is also the lead character in the comic Lando: Double or Nothing (2018), a five-issue miniseries set just before Solo: A Star Wars Story.

The 2020 relaunch of Marvel's Star Wars series, picking up at the tail end of The Empire Strikes Back, reveals that Lando returns to Cloud City to retrieve Lobot and help Luke look for his lightsaber.

Books
The novel Star Wars: Last Shot reveals that between Return of the Jedi and The Force Awakens, Lando is considering settling down with a Twi'lek girlfriend.

Legends media
Legends novels, comics, and video games are not considered canonical to the films. With the 2012 acquisition of Lucasfilm by The Walt Disney Company, most of the licensed Star Wars novels and comics produced since the originating 1977 film Star Wars were rebranded as Star Wars Legends and declared non-canon to the franchise in April 2014.

The Star Wars comic book series released by Marvel Comics featured Lando as a prominent character following The Empire Strikes Back. In the comic series, he has a crime lord nemesis named Drebble, and Lando frequently made use of his foil's name as a cover identity so that any animosity he generates while using the alias will be brought against the real Drebble, not Lando himself. This eventually backfires when "Drebble's" exploits are recognized by the Rebellion and Lando—being the only person who knows of him—has to present the real Drebble with an award for his own activities.

Lando is a supporting character in Legends novels that took place after Return of the Jedi commonly depicted Lando as getting involved in a variety of entrepreneurial schemes, including Nomad City in Timothy Zahn's Thrawn trilogy and the Kessel Spice Mines in the works of Kevin J. Anderson. During The Corellian Trilogy, Lando goes on a galaxy-wide hunt for a rich wife, ultimately marrying Tendra Risant. With his in-laws' money and his entrepreneurial abilities, he opens a mining facility on the outer rim planet of Dubrillion. In The New Jedi Order and beyond, Lando continues being a valuable ally and friend to the Skywalker/Solo family. In Fury, the seventh novel of the Legacy of the Force series, Lando announces to Han and Leia that he and Tendra are having a child.

Kevin J. Anderson stated that Lucasfilm toyed with the idea of killing off Lando, noting the character had run his course for Expanded Universe authors in the 1990s.

The Lando Calrissian Adventures

The Lando Calrissian Adventures is a 1983 trilogy of science fiction novels by L. Neil Smith. Set in the Star Wars Expanded Universe, the novels chronicle Lando's smuggling days before the events of the original Star Wars trilogy.
The series has been described as "space pulp", and highlights the differences between Lando and Han Solo. The books were released in July, October, and December 1983, and were the first Star Wars books released since The Han Solo Adventures (1979–1980); both trilogies were originally published by Del Rey, a division of Ballantine Books. They were also among the last novels in the franchise until Timothy Zahn's Thrawn trilogy was released in the early 1990s.
The series is set 3–2 years before the original Star Wars film, and is brought into chronological context with the rest of the Expanded Universe in Rebel Dawn  (1998), the final book of A. C. Crispin's Han Solo Trilogy.

For the duration of the trilogy, Lando is accompanied by a droid named Vuffi Raa. The novelization of Solo: A Star Wars Story makes reference to the events of the first book as a previous adventure of Lando's, which he recounts while composing his autobiographical "Calrissian Chronicles". He further estimates that it will be the first in a trilogy of his adventures.

Lando Calrissian and the Mindharp of Sharu is the first novel in Smith's Lando Calrissian trilogy, published by Del Rey on 1 July 1983. It is noted as being more of a psychedelic fantasy novel than hard science fiction.
The book begins shortly after Lando wins the Millennium Falcon in a game of sabacc, as well as a robot which must be picked up in the Rafa system. Upon the planet of Rafa IV, convicts are made to harvest mind-draining 
"life-crystals" which prolong the life of elite citizens. Lando is arrested and brought before the colony's corrupt governor and the sorcerer Rokur Gepta, who will let him keep his life and liberty if he can locate the legendary Mindharp of the ancient and long-lost Sharu civilization. The Mindharp is revealed to be kept inside a multidimensional pyramid with mind-altering properties, which provides a strange adventure for the daring Lando.

Lando Calrissian and the Flamewind of Oseon is the second novel in the trilogy, published on 1 October 1983. After selling a load of life-crystals, and accompanied by his droid Vuffi Raa, Lando attempts a career as an honest freighter captain. After some bad luck, he is soon nostalgic for his old trade. Fortunately, he is invited to a sabacc game on Oseon celebrating an event called Flamewind, but is followed by Rokur Gepta. After an explosion rocks the hull of the Falcon, they safely land. During the sabacc game, Lando is distracted by the apparent sabotage of his ship, and is assaulted. He comes under trial for having a weapon, illegal on the planet. He is offered a smuggling deal as an alternative to execution.

Lando Calrissian and the Starcave of ThonBoka is the third novel, published on 1 December 1983. Nearly a year after Lando and Vuffi Raa have left the Oseon system, while traveling in deep space they encounter Lehesu, a vacuum-breathing creature. Able to establish communication, they find out he is also on an adventure away from his home, the ThonBoka nebula. A month later, Lando and Raa receive word that ThonBoka is under attack from the Imperial Centrality Navy. Lehesu's exploration of the Centrality apparently provoked the attack on his species. Lando and Raa rush to assist their friend.
The Imperial blockade makes Lando nervous, but he cons his way through the fleet. When the Millennium Falcon strays from its course and is ordered to return, they dump explosives and go into hyperspace to fake the Falcon's destruction. Meanwhile, Rokur Gepta forms an alliance with a confederate squadron. Lando and Raa reunite with Lehesu, and hear of a negotiation attempt which only results in an outbreak of battle. The vacuum-breathing creatures use their projection and hyperspace abilities to fool the Imperial Navy, which fires on its allied ships. As Vuffi Raa pilots the Falcon, Lando engages the enemy in battle from the quad-gun in one of their last adventures before Raa is resummoned to his original programming.

Video games
Williams reprised his role as Lando in Legends videogame Star Wars: Jedi Knight II: Jedi Outcast.
In Lego Star Wars: The Complete Saga, Calrissian is an unlockable playable character, having the characteristic of being able to kiss Leia's hand if she is nearby. Lando is also a playable character in the multiplayer aspect of the 2017 game Star Wars: Battlefront II.

Concept and creation

Development

During development of the character, the original teaser trailer for The Empire Strikes Back introduced him as Landau Calrissian rather than his final name of Lando.

Actor Yaphet Kotto was an early choice for the role of Lando Calrissian, but chose to appear in the prison drama Brubaker instead. In writing The Empire Strikes Back, Lucas initially considered that Lando Calrissian was a clone from a planet of clones which caused the Clone Wars mentioned in the original Star Wars film.

Lando's cane in The Rise of Skywalker was designed to resemble Cloud City. It is inscribed "Baron Lando Calrissian".

In 2019, Billy Dee Williams discussed that he built the character around the two features he found interesting; the cape, and the Armenian name "Calrissian".

Portrayal
In 2018, The Verge noted that despite Han Solo's first name being written as "Han" and franchise creator George Lucas also pronouncing the name as "Han" off-screen, within the films most characters, including Luke Skywalker, pronounce it as "Hahn". The Verge also noted how Billy Dee Williams' Lando seems to be the only character to pronounce it as "Han" like Lucas, and that when, in The Empire Strikes Back, Lando is choked by Chewbacca for betraying Han, Lando causes most other characters to shift to "Han". In Solo: A Star Wars Story, Glover decided to deliberately use "Han" instead of "Hahn" in order to honor the character's trait.

Ahead of the release of Solo: A Star Wars Story, co-writer Jonathan Kasdan suggested that Lando is pansexual and stated, "There's a fluidity to Donald and Billy Dee's [portrayal of Lando's] sexuality ... I would have loved to have gotten a more explicitly LGBT character into this movie. I think it's time, certainly, for that, and I love the fluidity ― sort of the spectrum of sexuality that Donald appeals to and that droids are a part of. He doesn't make any hard and fast rules." When asked about a scene where L3-37 jokes about Lando's being flirtatious towards Han, writer Lawrence Kasdan said, "That is her personality. Maybe it means something, maybe it doesn't." When asked about Lando's pansexuality, Donald Glover stated, "How can you not be pansexual in space? There's so many things to have sex with." An upcoming Marvel pride-themed series of comic covers is slated to feature Lando, apparently canonizing the character's LGBT status.

Reception
Author Adilufu Nama wrote in 2008 that Lando "offered a new benchmark in the status of black representation in science fiction cinema". According to Alyssa Rosenberg of The Washington Post, Lando is a "fascinating and fraught part of the Star Wars legacy and the conversation around race in science fiction". She added that "Lando's the only character in Star Wars with a truly comfortable sense of style." On his portrayal, she wrote, "One of Williams's accomplishments in Empire and Return of the Jedi is how much he [feels] like an old-fashioned movie star in a futuristic setting without making the performance seem incongruous."

Lando Calrissian was chosen as the 11th best Star Wars character by IGN and the 12th best Star Wars hero by IGN's Jesse Schedeen, who also said that he was one of the characters he would most like to see in Star Wars: The Force Unleashed.

In 2015, Billy Dee Williams publicly admitted that he received backlash from children who were angered by Lando's betrayal of Han Solo in The Empire Strikes Back. Williams felt that the situation would have been different if Lando had been played by a white actor. Williams wrote that "Lando is not black or white, he's just Lando. Above and beyond the arguments or discussions of bygone eras, he is of the future." He further stated,

Writing for The Verge, Megan Farokhmanesh criticized Jonathan Kasdan's assertion that Lando is pansexual as "a piss-poor shot at representation", and argued that Kasdan was conflating pansexuality with promiscuity. Farokhmanesh compared the assertion to J. K. Rowling's statement that her character Albus Dumbledore is gay, despite no Harry Potter media depicting this. In 2019, Billy Dee Williams criticized the decision as well, blaming Solo's underperformance at the box office on its focus on this "topical" issue.

In popular culture

 A Kenner Lando Calrissian action figure appears among Elliott's toys in E.T. the Extra-Terrestrial.
 In Something, Something, Something, Dark Side and It's a Trap!, Family Guys parodies of The Empire Strikes Back and Return of the Jedi, Mort Goldman served as a stand-in for Lando Calrissian.
 Lando appeared in some episodes of Robot Chicken.
 Lando appears as one of the judges of the "Coolympics" in The Cleveland Show episode, "Back to Cool".
 Lando Calrissian appears in the Mad episode "Moves Like Jabba".
 A bird version of Lando nicknamed Lando Bird appears in Angry Birds Star Wars.
 Lando's Lego version makes a cameo appearance in The Lego Movie.
 In the TV series Timeless season 2 episode 22 ("The King of the Delta Blues", 4/22/18), Connor Mason (Paterson Joseph) uses Lando Calrissian as his alias and stands in as the technician for the legendary recording session with Robert Johnson; when he returns to the present, his record dust jacket has Lando Calrissian listed as the recording technician.
 Lando Calrissian makes cameo appearances in The Simpsons short films The Force Awakens from Its Nap and Plusaversary.
 In February 2006, Williams guest starred as himself in the season 5 episode "Her Story II" of Scrubs, in which he plays the godfather of Julie (Mandy Moore). Turk (Played by Donald Faison) hugs him, calling him "Lando", even though he prefers to be called Billy Dee.

Explanatory notes

References

External links
 
 
 Lando Calrissian on IMDb

Black characters in films
Characters created by George Lucas
Fictional space pilots
Fictional barons and baronesses
Fictional business executives
Fictional con artists
Fictional aerospace engineers
Fictional fighter pilots
Fictional gamblers
Fictional generals
Fictional heads of state
Fictional outlaws
Fictional pansexuals
Fictional LGBT characters in film
Fictional LGBT men
Fictional revolutionaries
Fictional mining engineers
Fictional tricksters
Fictional war veterans
Film characters introduced in 1980
Male characters in film
Star Wars literary characters
Star Wars Skywalker Saga characters
Star Wars Anthology characters